Dharambir Singh (b 1955) is an Indian politician and a member of Lok Sabha from Bhiwani-Mahendragarh (Lok Sabha constituency), Haryana. He won the 2014 and 2019 Indian general elections, being a Bharatiya Janata Party member.

During his political career, he is famous for defeating the 3 generations of Bansi Lal family. He has also lost many elections against members of that family. He defeated Bansi Lal from Tosham (Vidhan Sabha constituency) as a Lok Dal candidate in 1987, then he defeated his son, Surender from Tosham in 2000 as a member of Congress, and later Bansi Lal's grand daughter (Surender's daughter) Shruti Choudhry from Bhiwani-Mahendragarh (Lok Sabha constituency) as a member of BJP in 2014 and 2019.

References

India MPs 2014–2019
Living people
People from Bhiwani district
Lok Sabha members from Haryana
Bharatiya Janata Party politicians from Haryana
1955 births
India MPs 2019–present